Cornelius was a Roman centurion who is considered by Christians to be the first Gentile to convert to the faith, as related in Acts of the Apostles (see Ethiopian eunuch for the competing tradition). The baptism of Cornelius is an important event in the history of the early Christian church. He may have belonged to the gens Cornelia, a prominent Roman family.

Biblical account
Cornelius was a centurion in the Cohors II Italica Civium Romanorum, mentioned as Cohors Italica in the Vulgate. He was stationed in Caesarea, the capital of Roman Iudaea province. He is depicted in the New Testament as a God-fearing man who always prayed and was full of good works and deeds of alms. Cornelius receives a vision in which an angel of God tells him that his prayers have been heard; he understands that he has been chosen for a higher alternative. The angel then instructs Cornelius to send the men of his household to Joppa, where they will find Simon Peter, who is residing with a tanner by the name of Simon (ff).

The conversion of Cornelius comes after a separate vision given to Simon Peter himself. In the vision, Simon Peter sees all manner of beasts and fowl being lowered from Heaven in a sheet. A voice commands Simon Peter to eat. When he objects to eating those animals that are unclean according to Mosaic Law, the voice tells him not to call unclean that which God has cleansed.

When Cornelius' men arrive, Simon Peter understands that through this vision the Lord commanded the Apostle to preach the Word of God to the Gentiles. Peter accompanies Cornelius' men back to Caesarea. When Cornelius meets Simon Peter, he falls at Peter's feet. Simon Peter raises the centurion and the two men share their visions. Simon Peter tells of Jesus' ministry and the Resurrection; the Holy Spirit descends on everyone at the gathering. The Jews among the group are amazed that Cornelius and other uncircumcised should begin speaking in tongues, praising God. Thereupon Simon Peter commands that Cornelius and his followers, "kinsmen and near friends", be baptized.
The controversial aspect of Gentile conversion is taken up later at the Council of Jerusalem (Acts 15).

Religious situation of Judea
Taking into account that Judea had been within the Hellenic orbit since the conquest of Alexander the Great, there was time for wise men and philosophers, both Greek and Jewish, to exchange knowledge, thus beginning the syncretism between Hellenism and Judaism, a phenomenon that occurred in the rest of his empire. Later with the arrival of the Romans (already Hellenized), there were no problems of religious tolerance (except in the case of the Zealots), since thanks to the interpretatio graeca exported by the Macedonians, it was possible to identify Caelus (Roman god) or Uranus (his Greek equivalent) and Yahweh as the Supreme God himself, allowing conversion cases like Cornelius.

Significance

Cornelius is considered to be one of the first gentile converts to Christianity.

The baptism of Cornelius is an important event in the history of the early Christian church, along with the conversion and baptism of the Ethiopian eunuch. The Christian church was first formed around the original disciples and followers of Jesus, all of whom, including Jesus himself, were Galilean, except for Judas, who was Judean. All males in the Judean community were Jews: they were circumcised and observed the Law of Moses. The reception of Cornelius sparked a debate among the leaders of the new community of followers of Jesus, culminating in the decision to allow Gentiles to become Christians without conforming to Jewish requirements for circumcision, as recounted in Acts 15.

Traditions
Certain traditions hold Cornelius as becoming either the first bishop of Caesarea, or the bishop of Scepsis in Mysia.

Commemoration
His feast day on the new Martyrologium Romanum is 20 October. He is commemorated in the Orthodox tradition on 13 September.

Cornelius is honored on the liturgical calendar of the Episcopal Church in the United States of America on February 4. When Governors Island in New York City was a military installation, the Episcopal Church maintained a stone chapel there dedicated to him.

The Greek-French philosopher Cornelius Castoriadis is named after him.

Gallery
Images of St. Cornelius Chapel, Governors Island, New York

See also
Acts 10
Biblical law in Christianity
Saint Cornelius the Centurion, patron saint archive

References

Further reading

External links 
Saint Cornelius the Centurion at the Christian Iconography web site
The Story of the Chapel of St. Cornelius the Centurion at Governors Island, New York Harbor, Written for the Day of the Consecration, October 19, A.D. 1906. by Morgan Dix

1st-century Romans
Saints from the Holy Land
Cultural assimilation
Christian saints from the New Testament
Ancient Roman soldiers
People in Acts of the Apostles
Converts to Christianity from pagan religions
Angelic visionaries
Cornelii
Military saints
Bishops of Caesarea
Anglican saints